Hoseynabad (also Romanized as Ḩoseynābād; also known as Ḩasanābād) is a village in Howmeh Rural District, in the Central District of Ferdows County, South Khorasan Province, Iran. At the 2006 census, its population was 377, in 105 families.

References 

Populated places in Ferdows County